Alexander Laloo Hek, also known as A.L. Hek, is an Indian politician from Meghalaya and the current Minister of the Indian state of Meghalaya serving in the NPP-UDP-PDF-HSPDP-BJP administration. He is the BJP MLA from Pynthorumkhrah assembly Constituency.

References

External links
On indianict.com
On MyNeta

Living people
Bharatiya Janata Party politicians from Meghalaya
Meghalaya MLAs 2018–2023
1967 births
People from East Khasi Hills district